Ogonnelloe is a civil parish in east County Clare, Ireland, situated on the R463 regional road between Scariff and Killaloe and in the surrounding hills. It forms part of the Catholic parish of the same name.

Location
The parish is in the barony of Tulla.
It lies on the south side of Scariff bay, which opens into Lough Derg.
Most of the parish lies in a valley, with high hills in the background.
Most of the land is suitable for farming, but there is some mountain bog.

Townlands are Aughinish, Ballybran, Ballybroghan, Ballyheefy, Ballyhurly, Ballylaghnan, Ballynagleragh, Bealkelly (Eyre), Bealkelly (Purdon), Caher, Carrowcore, Carrowena, Carrowgar, Islandcosgry, Rahena Beg and Rahena More.

People
Dr. Joseph Stuart, deceased, former President of the GAA (1958–1961)

References

External links
 Ogonnelloe hurling club
 Ogonnelloe national school

Townlands of County Clare
Populated places on the River Shannon
Civil parishes of County Clare
Parishes of the Roman Catholic Diocese of Killaloe